Hyde Jekyll, Me is a 2015 South Korean television series starring Hyun Bin and Han Ji-min. It is based on Lee Choong-ho's webtoon Dr. Jekyll Is Mr. Hyde, which gave a romantic comedy spin on the literary character. The series aired on SBS from January 21 to March 26, 2015 on Wednesdays and Thursdays at 21:55 for 20 episodes.

Synopsis

Gu Seo-jin (Hyun Bin), is a third-generation chaebol who runs the theme park Wonder Land. He seemingly has everything — looks, brains, and fortune. He is also in line to become the next CEO of Wonder Group, the conglomerate his family owns, though his cousin Ryu Seung-yeon (Han Sang-jin), who oversees Wonder Hotel is his rival for the position. But Seo-jin has dissociative identity disorder. Whenever his heart rate exceeds 150, another personality emerges, and unlike Seo-jin's usual cold, cynical and ruthless self, Robin is kind, gentle and has a savior complex. This split personality began 15 years ago, and Seo-jin's doctor Kang Hee-ae believes that Robin is a manifestation of his guilt regarding a traumatic incident then. Because of this, Seo-jin avoids anything that might cause him to have a strong physical or emotional reaction which could trigger Robin's reappearance, even if that means shutting himself away from the world and eschewing any meaningful relationships.

Jang Ha-na (Han Ji-min), has just returned to Korea after spending several years in the United States with Cirque du Soleil. Like her grandfather and father before her, she is set to take over as circus master of the circus show at Wonder Land, which had once been the park's primary attraction. Ha-na vows to save the failing circus and dreams of revamping it back to its former glory, but she finds herself butting heads with Seo-jin, who wants to get rid of it due to low ticket sales and high overhead costs. But with every antagonistic encounter with Ha-na, Seo-jin notes the alarming spike on his heart monitor, and the two become further embroiled with each other. After Dr. Kang tells Seo-jin that she has found a cure for his condition, she gets kidnapped by a mysterious assailant who almost succeeds in killing Ha-na, making her the only witness. However, the traumatic experience has caused Ha-na to block out the man's face, and she goes to Dr. Kang's student, hypnotherapist Yoon Tae-joo (Sung Joon), to help her remember. With Ha-na's life in danger, the more Robin appears and the more she falls for him, to Seo-jin's dismay.

Cast

Main
Hyun Bin as Goo Seo-jin / Robin
Han Ji-min as Jang Ha-na 
Jung Ji-so as young Jang Ha-na
Sung Joon as Yoon Tae-joo / Lee Soo-hyun
Lee Hye-ri as Min Woo-jung

Supporting
Lee Seung-joon as Kwon Young-chan
Han Sang-jin as Ryu Seung-yeon
Hwang Min-ho as Ahn Sung-geun
Shin Eun-jung as Kang Hee-ae
Lee Deok-hwa as Goo Myung-han
Kim Do-yeon as Han Joo-hee
Kwak Hee-sung as Sung Suk-won
Lee Se-na as Choi Seo-hee
Lee Jun-hyeok as Detective Na
Moon Yeong-dong as Park Hee-bong
Lee Won-keun as Lee Eun-chang
Oh Na-ra as Cha Jin-joo
Maeng Sang-hoon as Director Min
Kim Ji-eun as Myung-han's secretary
Heo Jung-eun

Original soundtrack

Part 1

Part 2

Part 3

Part 4

Part 5

Part 6

Part 7

Reception
The series received low percentage of ratings for a prime-time television series. It received mainly negative reviews, particularly for its inconsistent plot.

Ratings

Controversies
Author Lee Choong-ho, who in 2011 wrote the webtoon Hyde Jekyll, Me was adapted from, alleged on his Twitter account that the screenwriter of Kill Me, Heal Me plagiarized his work. Both TV series are about a woman who falls in love with a man with multiple personality disorder, and air in the same timeslot. MBC denied the plagiarism accusation, while SBS clarified that Lee's statement was his personal opinion and did not reflect the stance of the whole production team.

Thailand's Channel 3 television drama   received criticism that its plot was too similar to Hyde. However, the producer insisted that there was no plagiarism involved.

Notes

References

External links
 

Dr. Jekyll Is Mr. Hyde webtoon at Daum 

2015 South Korean television series debuts
2015 South Korean television series endings
Seoul Broadcasting System television dramas
Television shows based on South Korean webtoons
South Korean romantic comedy television series
Dissociative identity disorder in television